The Alaska Native Tribal Health Consortium (ANTHC) is a non-profit health organization based in Anchorage, Alaska, which provides health services to 158,000 Alaska Natives and American Indians in Alaska. Established in 1997, ANTHC is a consortium of the tribal regional health organizations. The Board of Directors for ANTHC equally represent all tribal regions of Alaska and each region has parity. 

ANTHC is co-manager, with the Southcentral Foundation, of the Alaska Native Medical Center (ANMC), a 150-bed facility in Anchorage with a staff including more than 250 physicians and 700 nurses.  ANMC is a level II trauma center, the highest level that can be achieved in Alaska. It has received Magnet Status for nursing excellence, a designation achieved by only about 7 percent of all hospitals nationwide. It is the only tribal operated hospital with Magnet Status in the United States. ANMC opened in its current facility in May 1997. ANMC has a hybrid operating room. ANTHC pays market rate compensation to all employees to retain and attract the best qualified Alaska Native professionals and top quality providers and engineers.

In 1998, ANTHC launched the Alaska Federal Health Care Access Network (AFHCAN) to provide primary and specialty telehealth services to Alaska Native communities.

In 2003, ANTHC developed the Alaska Dental Health Aide Program to train dental therapists who could provide culturally appropriate education and routine dental services under the supervision of a dentist to high-risk residents of rural villages. These therapists now provide dedicated access to oral health care for more than 35,000 individuals, most of whom lived in communities that typically did not have a dedicated provider.

In 2014, a new day surgery opened followed by new Infusion Center and Internal Medicine Clinics in 2016. In January 2017, ANTHC opened a new 202 bed patient housing facility which includes Ronald McDonald House on the 6th floor. This is the first partnership of a Ronald McDonald House with a tribal organization. 

ANTHC is part of the Alaska Tribal Health System and is one of 22 co-signers of the Alaska Tribal Health Compact, a self-governance agreement with the Indian Health Service.

Membership 
Kodiak Area Native Association
Tanana Chiefs Conference
Copper River Native Association
Aleutian Pribilof Islands Association
Arctic Slope Native Association
Bristol Bay Area Health Corporation
Chugachmiut, Native Village of Eyak
Maniilaq Association
Metlakatla Indian Community
Norton Sound Health Corporation
Southcentral Foundation
SouthEast Alaska Regional Health Consortium
Chickaloon Native Village
Yukon-Kuskokwim Health Corporation

Legislation
The Alaska Native Tribal Health Consortium Land Transfer Act (H.R. 623; 113th Congress) is a bill that would transfer some land in Alaska from the federal government to the Alaska Native Tribal Health Consortium to be used to build a patient housing facility so that the organization can treat people who travel there from distant rural areas.  The bill passed the United States House of Representatives on October 29, 2013.

See also
 List of Alaska Native tribal entities
 List of hospitals in Alaska

References

External links
 Alaska Native Tribal Health Consortium
 Alaska Native Medical Center
 Alaska Native Health Board
 Magnet Status 
 Alaska Emergency Medical Services System

Alaska Native culture in Anchorage
Alaska Native organizations
Healthcare in Alaska
Non-profit organizations based in Anchorage, Alaska
1997 establishments in Alaska
Organizations established in 1997
Native American health